Tudiya or Tudia was according to the Assyrian King List (AKL) the first Assyrian monarch, ruling in Assyria's early period, though he is not attested in any known contemporary artefacts. He is listed among the “seventeen kings who lived in tents.” His existence is unconfirmed archaeologically and uncorroborated by any other source. According to the list, Tudiya was succeeded by Adamu.

Similarities with Hammurabi genealogy

Tudiya is succeeded on the Assyrian King List by Adamu and then a further fifteen rulers: Yangi, Suhlamu, Harharu, Mandaru, Imsu, Harsu, Didanu, Hana, Zuabu, Nuabu, Abazu, Belu, Azarah, Ushpia, and Apiashal. Nothing concrete is yet known about these names, although it has been noted that a much later Babylonian tablet listing the ancestral lineage of Hammurabi of Babylon, seems to have copied the same names from Tudiya through Nuabu, though in a heavily corrupted form: Tudiya's name seems to be joined with that of Adamu to appear there as Tubtiyamutu.

Alleged attestations and disproval
In initial archaeological reports from Ebla, it appeared that Tudiya's existence was confirmed with the discovery of a tablet where it was stated that he had concluded a treaty for the operation of a kārum in Eblaite territory, with "King" Ibrium of Ebla (who is now known to have instead been the vizier of the King Isar-Damu of Ebla.) This entire reading is now questionable, as several scholars have more recently argued that the treaty in question was not with king Tudiya of Assur at all, but rather with the unnamed king of an uncertain location called "Abarsal".

Geopolitical context

Oligarchy
The king lists suggest that the earliest Assyrian kings, who are recorded as, “kings who lived in tents,” had at first been independent semi-nomadic pastoralist rulers, moreover; Assyria was originally an oligarchy rather than a monarchy. These kings had at some point become fully urbanized and founded the city-state of Assur.

See also

Timeline of the Assyrian Empire
Early Period of Assyria
List of Assyrian kings
Assyrian continuity
Assyrian people
Assyria

References

Bibliography
Edmond Sollberger, "the so-called treaty between Ibla and 'Ashur'", Studii Eblaiti 3 (1980:129-155).

25th-century BC Assyrian kings
24th-century BC Assyrian kings